Maglavit Monastery is an Orthodox monastery in Romania, located in Maglavit commune in Dolj County.  It is built at the place where the shepherd Petrache Lupu would have seen God. The place was called "La buturug". Petrache Lupu was a deaf and mute shepherd that convinced hundreds of thousands of pilgrims that God appeared to him. The monastery was closed in the communist period and opened after 1989.

See also
Petrache Lupu

References

Bibliography
 România - Harta mănăstirilor, Amco Press, 2000
Mănăstirea Maglavit, loc al miracolelor și credinței
Mănăstirea Maglavit, punct de atracţie pentru pelerini
Manastirea Maglavit
Mănăstirea Maglavit şi-a sărbătorit hramul
DOSAR: Fenomenul Maglavit şi Petrache Lupu

External links
Official website
page on Mitrolopolia Olteniei

Christian monasteries in Romania